Where's the Money is a 2017 American comedy film directed by Scott Zabielski and written by Ted Sperling and Benjamin Sutor. The film stars Andrew Bachelor, Kat Graham, Logan Paul, Terry Crews, Mike Epps, Method Man, and Josh Brener. The film had a limited release in theaters by Lionsgate on October 20, 2017.

Plot
Del Goodlow has always lived in the Los Angeles hood and works at a gym his father started. The gym was meant to keep kids off the streets, from doing drugs and joining gangs. But now, his father is in jail and the gym is being driven into debt.

One day, Del's father Dre calls him and tells him he has a surprise. In jail, he informs Del about $1 million hidden in the basement of a flop house. Del goes to the address and finds that it has been turned into a fraternity. He tries to get into the basement by posing as a fire inspector but is caught because his badge is written in Spanish. He comes back later to rush the fraternity KAX. Del is sent to the side with the other non-white people, but coaxes them into leaving and joins with the white people.

After several initiation rituals which include spanking with bats, cleaning a house with toothbrushes, and wearing baby costumes at a house party, Del eventually earns the fraternity's trust and manages to steal the money, but is discovered by fraternity member Brock. Del convinces the other members he did not steal it and they go to a gym where Del discovers his friends have been tied up by his Uncle Leon, who has the money.

The fraternity, Del's mother, Uncle Leon, and a gang all want the money. As Leon holds the gang leader at gunpoint, he is killed by a falling air conditioner, which Del's mother had been constantly saying needed to be fixed. In the end, everyone gets some of the money, the gym is saved, and the leader of the gang gets a job at the gym. The KAX fraternity helps renovate the gym and do "real charity".

Cast
 Andrew Bachelor as Del Goodlow
 Kat Graham as Alicia
 Terry Crews as Leon Goodlow
 Mike Epps as Dre Goodlow
 Method Man as Trap / Gang Leader
 Josh Brener as Clark
 Logan Paul as Eddie
 Retta as Del's mother
 Caleb Emery as Ben
 Allen Maldonado as Juice
 Devon Werkheiser as Brock

Production
In April 2016, it was announced that Andrew "King Bach" Bachelor would star in the comedy film Where's the Money from Rivers Edge Films, with Dylan Sellers producing. On June 1, 2016, it was reported that Scott Zabielski would direct the film from Sellers' and Ted Sperling's story, and from a screenplay by Sperling and Benjamin Sutor, and producers would be Sellers and Zack Schiller, with Boies / Schiller Film Group financing the film. More cast was announced which included Logan Paul, Kat Graham, Terry Crews, Mike Epps, Method Man, Josh Brener, Retta, Caleb Emery, Allen Maldonado, and Devon Werkheiser.

Principal photography on the film began on June 1, 2016 in and around Los Angeles.

Release
In September 2017, Lionsgate acquired the film's domestic distribution rights. The film had its limited release in theaters on October 20, 2017. Where's the Money was released on DVD and video on demand formats on October 24, 2017.

References

External links
 

American comedy films
2017 films
2017 comedy films
Hood comedy films
Films shot in Los Angeles
Lionsgate films
Films produced by Zack Schiller
2010s English-language films
2010s American films